The 389th Bombardment Squadron is an inactive United States Air Force unit. Its last assignment was with the 312th Bombardment Group, based at Ellington Field. Texas. It was inactivated on June 27, 1949.

History
Established in early 1942 as a light bomb squadron, equipped with A-24 Banshees, although equipped with export model A-31 Vengeance dive bombers for training.  Trained under Third Air Force in the southeast United States, also used for antisubmarine patrols over the Atlantic southeast coast and then Gulf of Mexico.

Deployed to Southern California in early 1943 to the Desert Warfare Center, trained in light bombing while supporting Army maneuvers in the Mojave Desert until October.

Re-equipped with North American A-36 Apache dive bombers and deployed to New Guinea as part of Fifth Air Force.  In the Southwest Pacific the squadron attacked Japanese strong points and tactical positions and targets of opportunity in support of MacArthur's campaign along the north coast of New Guinea; then advancing into the Netherlands East Indies and Philippines as part of the Island Hopping campaign.  Re-equipped with P-40s; then later A-20 Havocs.   Engaged in heavy fighting on Lete; Mindoro and Luzon in the Philippines during 1944-1945.

The squadron moved to Okinawa in mid August and after the Atomic Bomb missions had been flown; remained on Okinawa until December until returning to the United States with most personnel demobilizing. It was inactivated as a paper unit on January 6, 1946.

The squadron was reactivated as a B-29 Superfortress unit in the reserves in 1947, but lack of funding and personnel led to rapid inactivation.

Lineage
 Constituted 389th Bombardment Squadron (Light) on January 28, 1942
 Activated on March 15, 1942
 Redesignated: 389th Bombardment Squadron (Dive) on July 27, 1942
 Redesignated: 388th Bombardment Squadron (Light) on December 6, 1943
 Redesignated: 388th Bombardment Squadron (Heavy) on July 19, 1945
 Inactivated on December 18, 1945
 Redesignated: 388th Bombardment Squadron (Very Heavy) on July 14, 1947
 Activated in the reserve on July 30, 1947
 Inactivated on June 27, 1949

Assignments
 312th Bombardment Group, March 15, 1942 – December 18, 1945
 Tenth Air Force, July 30, 1947
 312th Bombardment Group, August 13, 1947 – June 27, 1949

Stations

 Bowman Field, Kentucky, March 15, 1942
 Will Rogers Airport, Oklahoma, June 12, 1942
 Hunter Field, Georgia, August 18, 1942
 DeRidder Army Airbase, Louisiana, February 18, 1943
 Rice Army Airfield, California, April 13, 1943
 Salinas Army Air Base, California, August 13 – October 24, 1943
 Jackson Airfield (7 Mile Drome), Port Moresby, New Guinea, November 30, 1943
 Gusap Airfield, New Guinea, January 3, 1944
 Nadzab Airfield Complex, New Guinea, June 11, 1944

 Hollandia Airfield Complex, Netherlands East Indies, July 4, 1944
 Tanauan Airfield, Leyte, Philippines Commonwealth, November 19, 1944
 McGuire Field, San Jose, Mindoro, Philippines Commonwealth, January 27, 1945
 Mangaldan Airfield, Luzon, Philippines Commonwealth, c. February 11, 1945
 Floridablanca Airfield (Basa Air Base), Luzon, Philippines Commonwealth, April 20, 1945
 Yontan Airfield, Okinawa, C. August 12 – December 13, 1945
 Fort Lawton, Washington, January 1–4, 1946
 Ellington Field, Texas, July 30, 1947 – June 27, 1949.

Aircraft
 A-31 Vengeance, 1942–1943
 A-24 Banshee, 1942–1943
 North American A-36, 1943
 P-40 Warhawk, 1943–1944
 A-20 Havoc, 1944–1945

References

 Maurer, Maurer (1983). Air Force Combat Units Of World War II. Maxwell AFB, Alabama: Office of Air Force History. .

External links

Military units and formations established in 1942
Bombardment squadrons of the United States Air Force
Bombardment squadrons of the United States Army Air Forces